Michael Begley (September 22, 1872 – August 24, 1938) was an American rower who competed in the 1904 Summer Olympics. He was born in the Irish part of the United Kingdom of Great Britain and Ireland and died in St. Louis, Missouri. In 1904 he was part of the American boat, which won the silver medal in the coxless fours.

References

External links
 profile

1872 births
1938 deaths
Rowers at the 1904 Summer Olympics
Olympic silver medalists for the United States in rowing
American male rowers
Medalists at the 1904 Summer Olympics